Saint-Ambroise is a municipality in Le Fjord-du-Saguenay County, in the region of Saguenay-Lac-Saint-Jean, Quebec, Canada.

References

External links

Municipalities in Quebec
Incorporated places in Saguenay–Lac-Saint-Jean